The Assyrian International News Agency is a privately funded, independent news agency which provides news and analysis on Assyrian and Assyrian-related issues.  It was founded by Peter BetBasoo and Firas Jatou in 1995.

Background
The website is registered to an address in Chicago, Illinois, belonging to Nineveh Software Corporation.

AINA articles have been cited by:

 The Wall Street Journal
 International Business Times
 The New York Times 
 CNN
 USA Today
 Fox News
 The Christian Post
 Crosswalk.com
 United Press International

References

External links
 

News agencies based in the United States
Assyrian-American culture in Illinois
Assyrian diaspora in North America